Adriana Sosnovschi (born 10 January 1998) is a Moldovan tennis player. 

Sosnovschi has won two ITF doubles titles, and has achieved career-high singles and doubles rankings of 919 and 1162, respectively. She made her debut for the Moldova Fed Cup Team in 2016, and has a record of 4–1.

On the junior tour, Sosnovschi achieved a career-high ranking of world No. 119 in January 2016.

ITF finals

Singles: 1 (0–1)

Doubles: 2 (2–0)

External links
 
 
 

1998 births
Living people
Moldovan female tennis players
Place of birth missing (living people)